Bergerocactus emoryi  is a species of cactus, known commonly as the golden-spined cereus, golden snake cactus, velvet cactus or golden club cactus. It is a relatively small cactus, but it can form dense thickets or colonies, with the dense yellow spines giving off a velvety appearance when backlit by the sun. From April to May, yellow, green-tinged flowers emerge, which transform into reddish, globular fruit. This species is native to the California Floristic Province, and is found in northwestern Baja California and a small part of California, in San Diego County and on the southern Channel Islands. Where the Mediterranean climate of the California Floristic Province collides with the subtropical Sonoran Desert near El Rosario, hybrids with two other species of cacti are found. It is the sole member of the monotypic genus Bergerocactus, named after German botanist Alwin Berger.

Description 
This species is a shrub-like cactus, forming thickets of columnar to prostrate stems. The colonies have a velvety appearance when backlit by the sun. The radial spines are straight.

The flowers emerges either laterally or at the apex of the stem, at the distal margin of the spine cluster. The ovary is free of hair, and densely spiny. The outer perianth parts are yellow, with the tips more-or-less red, and the midveins green, with the all of the inner perianth colored yellow. After blooming, a reddish, globular fruit emerges, covered in dense spines, and extruding seeds and pulp at the tip. The seeds are  large, shiny and black.

Taxonomy 
The cactus has a chromosome count of 2n=44. There is an extensive number of common names, which include the golden cereus, golden-spined cereus, golden snake cactus, velvet cactus, golden club cactus. The plant is also known as snake cactus, though this latter name also applies to Echinocereus pensilis.

Hybrids 
The golden cereus is known to hybridize with other species of cacti. Both occur in the vicinity of El Rosario. Hybrids include:

× Myrtgerocactus lindsayi 
Moran (Lindsay hybrid cactus)

A naturally occurring intergeneric hybrid with Myrtillocactus cochal. It is a triploid plant, which helps substantiate that it is a hybrid between the diploid M. cochal and the tetraploid B. emoryi. It has light-yellow flowers, and is known only from a few plants. Its generic name comes from those of its parents (Mytillocactus and Bergerocactus) and its specific epithet, "lindsayi", is in honor of the botanist George Lindsay. The cactus was first found by Lindsay near El Rosario, Baja California, in 1950 while on a trip to look for Pacherocactus. Specimens were cultivated at the Desert Botanical Garden, finally blooming in 1961 and formally described the following year.

× Pacherocactus orcuttii 
(K. Brandegee) G.D. Rowley (Orcutt hybrid cactus)

A naturally occurring intergeneric hybrid with Pachycereus pringlei, discovered near El Rosario, Baja California. The plant's generic name is formed from those of its parents (Pachycereus and Bergerocactus). Sometimes it can be found listed as Pachycereus × Bergerocactus. It can grow to a height of about 3.5 m and a diameter of about 10 cm. The cactus does not thrive below 10 °C. Its flowers are green-brown in color and of about 4 cm in size.

Distribution, habitat, and conservation 
The plant is near-endemic to Baja California, with the exception of populations on Santa Catalina Island, San Clemente Island, and San Diego, California. The populations remaining in San Diego are disjunct, located in Border Field State Park, Torrey Pines State Park, and Cabrillo National Monument, as the urban development in San Diego has relegated many species to these protected areas.

Other rare species that inhabit these enclaves of maritime succulent scrub in San Diego include Shaw's Agave, the Torrey Pine, the Tapertip liveforever, cliff spurge, and the San Diego barrel cactus. Aside from urban development, the plant is also threatened by collecting and feral goats.

The species is represented on the two of the southern California Channel Islands. On San Clemente Island, the golden cactus is found inhabiting rocky canyon walls.

In Baja California, the species continues from the border south into the succulent scrub to El Rosario. It occurs on numerous islands off the coast; however, climate change and other anthropogenic influences are threatening the insular populations. On Isla San Martin, a volcanic island off of the San Quintin Bay, only a single clump of the cactus is left.

Gallery

See also 
Flora of the maritime succulent scrub:

 Agave shawii
 Dudleya
 Acalypha californica

References

External links 
 CalFlora Database: Bergerocactus emoryi  (Cunyado,  Golden spined cereus)
 Jepson eFlora (TJM2) treatment of Bergerocactus emoryi 
 USDA Plants Profile for Bergerocactus emoryi 
 UC CalPhotos gallery of Bergerocactus emoryi 

Echinocereeae
Cacti of Mexico
Cacti of the United States
Flora of California
Flora of Baja California
Natural history of the California chaparral and woodlands
Natural history of the Channel Islands of California
Cactoideae genera
Monotypic Cactaceae genera
Endangered biota of Mexico
Endangered flora of North America
Natural history of San Diego County, California
Taxa named by Nathaniel Lord Britton
Taxa named by Joseph Nelson Rose